D57 state road in the eastern part of Croatia connects the city of Vukovar to the state road network of Croatia, and to the A3 motorway in Lipovac interchange. The route comprises some urban intersections, mostly in the city of Vukovar.

The road, as well as all other state roads in Croatia, is managed and maintained by Hrvatske ceste, a state-owned company.

Traffic volume 

Traffic is regularly counted and reported by Hrvatske ceste, operator of the road.

Road junctions and populated areas

Sources

D057
D057